Festival Bell is the twenty-fifth studio album by British folk rock band Fairport Convention, released in January 2011.

Overview
The name of the album (as well as the cover and the title track) is a reference to the bell of the same name that currently rings in St Mary's Church in Cropredy, Oxfordshire. The track "Ukulele Central" features guest appearances from comedian Frank Skinner and singer Joe Brown.

Release and critical reception

The album was released four years after the band's previous studio work, Sense of Occasion. It consists of 14 tracks, mixing original compositions with four cover versions including a reworking of the title track from the band's 1975 album Rising for the Moon. Record Collector magazine's 4 star review of the album stated: "Festival Bell is a work of maturity and depth, yet delivered with a lightness of touch that will delight fans old and new".

Track listing

 "Mercy Bay" (Chris Leslie)
 "Rui's Guitar" (Chris Leslie)
 "Danny Jack's Chase" (Ric Sanders)
 "Reunion Hill" (Richard Shindell)
 "Wouldn't Say No" (Chris Leslie)
 "Around the Wild Cape Horn" (Ralph McTell)
 "Celtic Moon" (Mark Evans, Carolyn Evans)
 "Ukulele Central" (Chris Leslie, Ric Sanders)
 "Albert and Ted" (Ric Sanders, Dave Pegg)
 "Darkside Wood" (Chris While)
 "London Apprentice" / "Johnny Ginears" (Ralph McTell / Ric Sanders)
 "Rising for the Moon" (Sandy Denny)
 "Danny Jack's Reward" (Ric Sanders)
 "The Festival Bell" (Chris Leslie)

Personnel
Fairport Convention
Simon Nicol - vocals, acoustic guitar, electric guitar, bass ukulele
Dave Pegg - vocals, bass guitar, ukulele, mandolin, acoustic guitar
Chris Leslie - vocals, mandolin, bouzuki, violin, Portuguese guitar, ukulele, whistle
Ric Sanders - backing vocals, violin, ukulele, keyboards, bass ukulele
Gerry Conway - drums, percussion

Guest musicians
Frank Skinner - banjo ukulele on "Ukulele Central"
Joe Brown - ukulele, backing vocals on "Ukulele Central"

References

Fairport Convention albums
2011 albums
Albums produced by John Gale